Guido Carlo Gatti (born 29 April 1938) is a retired Italian basketball player. He was part of Italian teams that won a gold medal at the 1963 Mediterranean Games and finished eighth at the 1968 Summer Olympics.

References

1938 births
Living people
Italian men's basketball players
1963 FIBA World Championship players
Olympic basketball players of Italy
Basketball players at the 1968 Summer Olympics
Pallacanestro Milano 1958 players
Mediterranean Games medalists in basketball
Mediterranean Games gold medalists for Italy
Competitors at the 1963 Mediterranean Games